Violin Sonata No. 4 may refer to:

 Violin Sonata No. 4 (Beethoven)
 Violin Sonata No. 4 (Hill)
 Violin Sonata No. 4 (Ives) (Children's Day at the Camp Meeting) by Charles Ives
 Violin Sonata No. 4 (Mozart)
 Violin Sonata No. 4 (Villa-Lobos) by Heitor Villa-Lobos